Pot of Gold was an Australian talent television series broadcast on The 0-10 Network between 1975 and 1978. It was hosted by Tommy Hanlon, Jr. There were many guest celebrity judges including the Twelfth Night Theatre artistic director, Joan Whalley.

Network 10 original programming
Australian music television series
1975 Australian television series debuts
1978 Australian television series endings
Music competitions in Australia
English-language television shows